Nico is a compilation album by American rock band Blind Melon, released in 1996 by Capitol Records. The album was released after lead singer Shannon Hoon's cocaine overdose that resulted in his death in 1995. The album was named for his daughter, Nico Blue, and the proceeds arising from album sales were placed in a college trust for her. It features
unreleased tracks, recordings started by Hoon and finished by the band, unreleased versions of previous songs ("No Rain" and "St. Andrew's Hall") and the cover songs "The Pusher" (Steppenwolf) and "John Sinclair" (John Lennon).

Track listing
All songs by Blind Melon except "The Pusher" (Hoyt Axton, with additional lyrics by Shannon Hoon) and "John Sinclair" (John Lennon).

"The Pusher" – 3:06
Recorded in Mammoth Mountain, California, April 1994.
"Hell" – 2:02
Recorded at Kelsey's Playground, Lafayette, Indiana, 1993.
"Soup" – 3:09
Recorded at Kingsway Studio, New Orleans, Louisiana, November 1994, during the "Soup" sessions.
"No Rain" [Ripped Away Version] – 2:25
Recorded at Bullet Sound Studio, The Netherlands, November 10, 1993.
"Soul One" – 3:15
Demo, recorded at Downtown Rehearsal, Los Angeles, California, 1991.
"John Sinclair" – 3:36
Recorded at Riversound Studio, New York City, March 7, 1995.
"All That I Need" – 2:50
Recorded in Mammoth Mountain, California, April 1994.
"Glitch" – 3:20
Recorded at Kelsey's Playground, Lafayette, Indiana, 1993.
"Life Ain't So Shitty" – 1:50
Recorded in a St. Louis hotel room, 1994.
"Swallowed" – 3:45
Recorded at Kingsway Studio, New Orleans, Louisiana, November 1994, during the "Soup" sessions.
"Pull" – 3:28
Recorded at Kingsway Studio, New Orleans, Louisiana, January 1995, during the "Soup" sessions.
"St. Andrew's Hall" – 3:36
Recorded in various hotel rooms during the 1994 U.S. tour.
"Letters from a Porcupine" – 1:54
Recorded on Christopher Thorn's answering machine by Shannon Hoon, calling from home in Lafayette, Indiana, 1994.

The Japanese edition of the album contained the bonus song "Three Is a Magic Number" as track 14, originally released on the Schoolhouse Rock! Rocks album.

Personnel
Blind Melon – producer, engineer, mixing
David Michael Dill – engineer
Shannon Hoon – acoustic guitar, lead vocals, engineer
Ken Lomas – engineer, assistant engineer
Brad Smith – bass guitar, dumbek, flute, conga, backing vocals, double bass
Rogers Stevens – acoustic guitar, conga, electric guitar, Hammond organ, shaker
Miles Tackett – cello
Andy Wallace – producer, engineer, mixing
Howie Weinberg – mastering
Glen Graham – dumbek, percussion, conga, drums, Mellotron
Liz Heller – executive producer
Tommy Steele – art direction
Jean Krikorian – design
Mike Napolitano – producer, assistant engineer, mixing
Christopher Thorn – acoustic guitar, banjo, electric guitar, tambourine, bells, Mellotron, lap steel guitar
Jeffery Fey – art direction
Danny Clinch – harmonica, photography
Leo Rossi – technical advisor
Lyle Eaves – engineer
Stephen Moses – trombone
Patrick Halligan  – triangle
Chris Jones – executive producer
John Burton – engineer

Charts

References

External links
 Blind Melon - Nico Album Lyrics

Blind Melon albums
1996 compilation albums
Capitol Records albums
Albums produced by Andy Wallace (producer)
Compilation albums published posthumously